The Council of European Aerospace Societies was formed in 1993 as the Confederation of European Aerospace Societies in recognition of the increasingly international nature of aerospace business. The transition from Confederation to Council took place in 2003 with the intention of providing improved collaboration, legal status and use of the resources of the constituent societies.

Constituent societies 

 Association Aéronautique et Astronautique de France (AAAF; Aeronautics and Astronautics Association of France)
 Asociación de Ingenieros Aeronáuticos de España (AIAE; Association of Aeronautical Engineers of Spain)
 Associazione Italiana di Aeronautica e Astronautica (AIDAA; Italian Association of Aeronautics and Astronautics)
 Deutsche Gesellschaft für Luft- und Raumfahrt (DGLR; German Society for Aeronautics and Astronautics)
 Flygtekniska Föreningen. Svensk förening för flygteknik och rymdteknik (FTF; Swedish Society of Aeronautics and Astronautics)
 Hellenic Aeronautical Engineers Society (HAES)
 Nederlandse Vereniging voor Luchtvaarttechniek (NVvL; Netherlands Association of Aeronautical Engineers)
 Royal Aeronautical Society (RAeS)
 Schweizerische Vereinigung für Flugwissenschaften (SWFV; Swiss Association of Aeronautical Sciences)
 Flygtekniska Föreningen in Sweden

External links 
 CEAS website

Aviation in Europe
International aviation organizations
Lists of aviation organizations
Transport organizations based in Europe